Pavel Pěnička (born 5 February 1967) is a retired Czech football defender. He made over 200 appearances in the Gambrinus liga, featuring for clubs including SK České Budějovice and FK Jablonec. He is the brother of footballer Martin Pěnička.

References

External links 

1967 births
Living people
Czech footballers
Czech First League players
FC Slovan Liberec players
SK Dynamo České Budějovice players
FK Jablonec players
Czech expatriate footballers
Expatriate footballers in Germany
Association football defenders
Sportspeople from Liberec